Fehmi Yavuz (1912–1991) was a former Turkish civil servant, academic, writer and a government minister

Early life
He was born in Isparta in 1912. After his primary and secondary education in Isparta he completed Pertevniyal High School in İstanbul. He graduated from the Faculty of Political Sciences of Ankara University 1937. In 1942, he returned to his faculty as the assistant of Professor Ernest Reuter. In 1951 he earned the title professor in the same faculty. Between 1953 and 1955 he studied urban development in United Kingdom. In 1958 he was elected as the dean of the faculty.

Political life
In 1960 after the 1960 Turkish coup, he was appointed as the Minister of National Education in the 24th government of Turkey between 30 May 1960 and 27 August 1960.  Following a reshuffle in the government he was appointed as the  Minister of Construction and Settlement. After the formation of the Constituent Assembly of Turkey in which he was a member, he continued in the same seat in the 25th government between 5 January 1961 and 6 February 1961.

Later years
After the constituent assembly term he returned to academic life and taught in the Middle East Technical University and Zonguldak Karaelmas University. He died on 11 July 1991.

Books
He was also a writer. The following are his books 

1946: Köy İdarelerimizin Maliyesi ("Finance of the Village Administration")
1952:Ankara'nın İmarı ve Şehirciliğimiz ("Reconstruction of Ankara and our Urbanism")
1953:Şehircilik Ders Kitabı ("Textbook of Urban Development")
1956: Şehirciliğimiz Hakkında Mukayeseli Raporlar ("Comparative Reports on the City Planning")
1960: Şehircide Aranan Vasıflar hakkında İngiliz Kraliyet Komisyonu Raporu ("British Royal Committee Report on the Qualifications of the City Planner")
1962: Şehirlerimizin Mali İdaresi Konusunda Anket Raporu ("A Survey on the Financial Administration of Turkish Municipalities")
1962:Şehircilik ("Urban Development")
1964: Memleketimizde Toplum Kalkınması ("Public development in our Country")
1964: Mahalli İdarelerimizin Problemleri ("Problems of Turkish Local Administration")
1966: Türk Mahalli İdarelerinin Yeniden Düzenlenmesi Üzerine bir Araştırme ("A Survey on the Reform of Turkish Local Administration")
1983:Ölüm Duyuruları ("Death Announcements")
Among these, "A Survey on the Financial Administration of Turkish Municipalities" and "Problems of Turkish Local Administration" were also published in English.

References

1912 births
1991 deaths
Ministers of National Education of Turkey
Members of the Constituent Assembly of Turkey
Members of the 24th government of Turkey
Members of the 25th government of Turkey
Ankara University Faculty of Political Sciences alumni
Pertevniyal High School alumni
People from Isparta
Academic staff of Ankara University
Academic staff of Middle East Technical University
Academic staff of Zonguldak Bülent Ecevit University